Talmadge may refer to:

Talmadge, Maine, a town in the US state of Maine
Talmadge, California, variant name of Talmage, California
Talmadge, San Diego, California, a neighborhood of San Diego, CA, US
Talmadge, Oregon, a town that no longer exists, but was originally in Polk County
Talmadge Memorial Bridge, a cable-stayed bridge in Savannah, GA, US
The Talmadge, historic building in Los Angeles, CA, US
Talmadge (surname), people with the surname Talmadge

See also 
Tallmadge (disambiguation)
Talmage (disambiguation)